Malcolm Starkey (born 25 January 1936) is an English former professional footballer. He played in The Football League with Blackpool, Shrewsbury Town and Chester and later worked as secretary at Shrewsbury.

Playing career
Starkey began his career at Blackpool as an inside forward, making three appearances before a move to Shrewsbury Town led to him playing regularly in attack alongside the prolific Arthur Rowley.

In April 1963, Starkey dropped into Football League Division Four with Chester, where he would soon be converted into a full back by new manager Peter Hauser. His spell at Chester would see him not miss a league game in 1964–65 but his career was to finish prematurely early in the 1966–67 season when he suffered a serious illness.

After retiring from playing, Starkey set up a sports shop in Shrewsbury with Dave Pountney and became a coach at his former club Shrewsbury Town. It was the start of a long stint with the club, which included long spells as both secretary and a director of the club. He was rewarded for his loyalty with a testimonial match between Shrewsbury and Aston Villa in May 2002.

External links

References

1936 births
English footballers
Living people
People from Bulwell
Footballers from Nottinghamshire
English Football League players
Association football forwards
Association football fullbacks
Blackpool F.C. players
Shrewsbury Town F.C. players
Chester City F.C. players